Francis Niakuam (born 16 October 1966) is a retired Papua New Guinean footballer who played as a striker for Sobou FC and the Papua New Guinean national team.

References

1966 births
Living people
Papua New Guinean footballers
Association football forwards
Papua New Guinea international footballers